Krini is a small village on the island of Corfu. The Castle of Angelokastro is located at the top of the highest peak of the island's shoreline.

References

Populated places in Corfu (regional unit)